Pierre de Brézé (or de Brezé) (c. 1410 – 16 July 1465) was a French soldier and courtier in the service of King Charles VII and King Louis XI.

Early life
Pierre de Brézé was born circa 1410.

Career
De Brézé rose to prominence during the Hundred Years' War. In 1433 he joined Yolande of Aragon and  constable Arthur de Richemont in forcing Charles VII's minister Georges de La Trémoille from power. He was knighted by Charles of Anjou in 1434 and subsequently joined the royal council. In 1437 he became seneschal of Anjou, and in 1440 of Poitou. During the Praguerie he served with the King's forces against those of the rebel nobles and the dauphin (heir apparent) Louis XI, who would bear a lasting grudge against him.

De Brézé fought against the English in Normandy in 1440 – 1441, and in Guienne in 1442. He was granted the title of Comte d'Évreux in 1441 for his role in the strategic maneuvers during Charles VII's Siege of Pontoise, which finally expelled the English from Île de France. The following year he became chamberlain to Charles VII and, through the influence of royal mistress Agnès Sorel, surpassed in power his old allies Arthur de Richemont and Charles of Anjou. The six years (1444 – 1450) of his ascendancy aligned with the most prosperous period of the reign of Charles VII. His most dangerous opponent in the royal court was the dauphin Louis, who in 1448 levied accusations against him, instigating a formal trial which ultimately resulted in his complete exoneration and his restoration to royal favor. He fought in Normandy from 1450 – 1451 and became seneschal of the province after the death of Agnès Sorel and the consequent decline of his influence at court.

He made an ineffective raid on the English coast at Sandwich in 1457, and was preparing an expedition to England in support of Margaret of Anjou (a supporter of the House of Lancaster in the War of the Roses) when the accession of Louis XI brought him disgrace and brief imprisonment. In 1462, however, his son Jacques married Louis's half-sister, Charlotte de Valois, daughter of Agnès Sorel. In 1462 he accompanied Margaret to Scotland with a force of 2000 men, and after the defeat of House Lancaster at the Battle of Hexham he brought her back to Flanders. On his return, he was reconciled with Louis XI and reappointed seneschal of Normandy.

He inherited the Château du Bec-Crespin from his brother-in-law, Antoine Crespin, in 1454.

Death and legacy
De Brézé died in the Battle of Montlhéry on the 16th of July, 1465. He was succeeded as seneschal of Normandy by his eldest son Jacques (c. 1440–1490), Count of Maulevrier.

The best contemporary account of Pierre de Brézé is given in the Chroniques of the Burgundian chronicler, Georges Chastellain, who had been his secretary. Chastellain addressed a Déprécation to Louis XI on his behalf at the time of his disgrace.

References

People of the Hundred Years' War
1410 births
1465 deaths
French knights